A duckbill valve is a check valve, usually manufactured from rubber or synthetic elastomer, and has 2 (or more) flaps, usually shaped like the beak of a duck.   It is commonly used in medical applications to prevent contamination due to backflow.

One end of the valve is stretched over the outlet of a supply line, conforming itself to the shape of the line, usually round.  The other end, the duckbill, retains its natural flattened shape.  When a fluid is pumped through the supply line and therefore the duckbill, the flattened end opens to permit the pressurized fluid to pass.  When pressure is removed, however, the duckbill end returns to its flattened shape, preventing backflow. 

The duckbill valve is similar in function to the mitral valve in the heart. See also Heimlich valve.

A trifold form of this valve, known as a joker valve, is used in one popular marine toilet.

References 

Valves